Vazvan (also Romanized as Vazvān and Wazwan) is a city in Meymeh District, Shahin Shahr and Meymeh County, Isfahan Province, Iran.  At the 2011 census, its population was 4,313 Iranian  in 1,413 families. Vazvan agriculture mostly grows wheat and potatoes.

References

Populated places in Shahin Shahr and Meymeh County

Cities in Isfahan Province